Kammermohr (or Hofmohr; pl. Kammermohren) was a German-speaking term since the 18th century for a court servant of black skin colour, which had by that time long been a common feature in European courts.

History
People of black skin colour from the Orient, Africa and America had often been taken to Europe as valets during the time of colonialism. This became common in the 16th-century and continued to be fashionable until the early 19th-century. The term Kammermohr was first used as an official term in a court protocol in 1747 in Saxon. 

The splendidly decorated Kammermohr, often in livery, served a ruler, church dignitaries or wealthy merchants as an exotic object of prestige and as a status symbol, showcasing their wealth and luxury lifestyle. Above all, however, the valets symbolized the worldwide relations of their employer.

Notable examples
 Anton Wilhelm Amo, kammermohr of Anthony Ulrich, Duke of Brunswick-Wolfenbüttel.
 Adriaan de Bruin, kammermohr
 Angelo Soliman, kammermohr of Austrian Emperor Joseph II.
 Ignatius Fortuna, kammermohr of  Countess Palatine Francisca Christina of Sulzbach
 Gustav Badin, kammermohr of first Queen Louisa Ulrika of Sweden and then Princess Sophia Albertine of Sweden. 
 Abraham Petrovich Hannibal, kammermohr of Peter the Great

See also
Chamberlain (office)
Court dwarf
Kizlar agha

References

Anti-black racism in Germany
18th century in the Holy Roman Empire
Courtiers